Gail E. Greenough,  (born March 7, 1960) was a member of the Canadian Equestrian Team for show jumping.

Life
Gail Greenough was born on March 7, 1960, in Edmonton, Alberta. When she was 11 years old, Greenough started learning equestrian skills. In 1983, she joined the Canadian Equestrian Team. She had gained some experience competing at a few World Cups.

Career
When Greenough competed with Mr. T, they competed for 5 days where they produced many clean rounds. In the final, however, she had to ride 3 of 4 rounds riding her competitors' horses. She rode cleanly and managed to incur no penalty points, thus taking the title and the $23,000 prize for first place. On July 13, 1986, Greenough won the 1986 World Show Jumping Championships in Aachen, West Germany, riding a Hanoverian horse named Mr T.  She was the first woman, the first North American, and the youngest person to win this championship, and she was the first rider to do so with zero faults in the competition. Also at the 1986 World Cup, she put on display her best show jumping while competing against 72 athletes. The odds were against her, but she finished four Finals without knocking down a rail or making any violations.

In June 1987, at the Loblaws Showjumping Classic, she took the victory, which qualified her to compete in the August 1987 Pan-Am Games and the World Cup competition. After these competitions were over, Greenough continued to compete for awhile with moderate success. After failing to secure a position on Canada's Olympic Equestrian Team in 1992, she retired.

After she stopped competing, she provided commentary for events on CBC Sports. Greenough participated in Prince Edward of the United Kingdom's charity television special The Grand Knockout Tournament in 1987. She became a member of the Canadian Show Jumping Team selection committee. In 2001, she made a return to the grand prix ring. She won several events. She also won the highly favored Chrysler Leading Canadian Rider Award at the Spruce Meadows Masters tournament. In 1990, she was made a Member of the Order of Canada.

Honors
 Alberta Female Athlete of the Year
 Alberta Premiers Award for Performance
 Canadian Equestrian Gold Medal
 1983 Canadian National Equestrian Team
 1984 Sports Federation of Canada Achievement Award
 1986 Edmonton Sports Report Association Amateur Athlete of the Year
 1986 TSN Female Athlete of the Year
 1987 Alberta Achievement Award
 1988 Edmonton YWCA Tribute to Women Award
 1988 Canadian Olympic Hall of Fame
 1988 Canadian Olympic Hall of Fame
 1994 Alberta Sports Hall of Fame
 1998 Canada Olympic Hall of Fame
 2001 Chrysler Leading Canadian Rider Award
 2006 Jump Canada Hall of Fame

Medals
 National Cup - Gold
 National Horse Show - Gold
 International Grand Prix - Gold
 National Grand Prix - Gold
 DuMaurier Grand Prix - Gold
Source:

Personal life
Greenough has her business now, Greenough Equestrian, in Creekside Farm near Calgary, Alberta. It is a clinic where she trains and teaches equestrian skills.

References

External links
 Video: Gail Greenough - "Jappeloup was a thrilling ride!"
 Gail Greenough - Mr T - Worlds in Aachen 1986
 Gail Greenough - Jappeloup - Worlds in Aachen 1986

1960 births
Living people
Canadian female equestrians
Canadian show jumping riders
Members of the Order of Canada
Sportspeople from Edmonton